

First round selections

The following are the first round picks in the 1980 Major League Baseball draft.

Compensation Picks

Other notable players 
Tim Teufel, 2nd round, 38th overall Minnesota Twins
Dan Plesac, 2nd round, 41st overall St. Louis Cardinals (did not sign)
Dave Miley, 2nd round, 47th overall Cincinnati Reds
Tim Burke†, 2nd round, 49th overall Pittsburgh Pirates
Joe Hesketh, 2nd round, 50th overall Montreal Expos
Danny Tartabull†, 3rd round, 71st overall Cincinnati Reds
Doug Drabek†, 4th round, 87th overall Cleveland Indians (did not sign)
Ricky Horton, 4th round, 92nd overall St. Louis Cardinals
Joe Orsulak, 6th round, 152nd overall Pittsburgh Pirates
Randy Ready, 6th round, 154th overall Milwaukee Brewers
Don Slaught, 7th round, 171st overall Kansas City Royals
Lloyd McClendon, 8th round, 183rd overall New York Mets
Eric Davis†, 8th round, 201st overall Cincinnati Reds
John Farrell, 9th round, 212th overall Oakland Athletics (did not sign)
Craig Lefferts, 9th round, 219th overall Chicago Cubs
Dave Magadan, 12th round, 310th overall Boston Red Sox (did not sign)
Ed Vande Berg, 13th round, 318th overall Seattle Mariners
Terry Steinbach†, 16th round, 400th overall Cleveland Indians (did not sign)
Jim Eisenreich, 16th round, 402nd overall Minnesota Twins
Oil Can Boyd, 16th round, 414th overall Boston Red Sox
Danny Jackson†, 24th round, 599th overall Oakland Athletics (did not sign)
Darren Daulton†, 25th round, 629th overall Philadelphia Phillies
Chris Sabo†, 30th round, 727th overall Montreal Expos (did not sign)
Walt Terrell, 33rd round, 763rd overall Texas Rangers
Rick Aguilera, 37th round, 803rd overall St. Louis Cardinals (did not sign)

† All-Star  
‡ Hall of Famer

Football players drafted
Turner Gill, 2nd round, 36th overall by the Chicago White Sox (did not sign)
Kevin House, 19th round, 475th overall by the Chicago White Sox (did not sign)

Notes

External links 
Complete draft list from The Baseball Cube database

References 

Major League Baseball draft
Draft
Major League Baseball draft